Lo Ting Wai (born 18 October 1985) is a Hong Kong rower. He competed in the men's lightweight double sculls event at the 2004 Summer Olympics.

References

External links
 

1985 births
Living people
Hong Kong male rowers
Olympic rowers of Hong Kong
Rowers at the 2004 Summer Olympics
Rowers at the 2006 Asian Games
Asian Games competitors for Hong Kong
21st-century Hong Kong people